Shevah Weiss (5 July 1935 – 3 February 2023) was an Israeli politician who served as Knesset Speaker under  Yitzhak Rabin. He was Israel's ambassador to Poland and chairman of Yad Vashem.

Biography
Shevah Weiss was born in Borysław, Poland to Gienia and Meir Wolf Weiss. During the Holocaust, his father built a hiding place for the family  behind the wall of their store. He built bunk beds, one on top of the other, up to the ceiling. Weiss lived in this tiny space with his parents, sister, brother, aunt, uncle, cousin and neighbor. Later they lived in the basement of a children’s orphanage. Neighbors provided them with food and water.  Weiss recalls: "My father cooked a soup consisting of one potato and water for our whole group. But in the end, we were reduced to chewing book covers made of genuine leather."Weiss later expressed his gratitude to the families who saved him, whom he described as “amazing people, my heroes…[who] will always be in my heart”. 

Weiss immigrated to Palestine in 1947. He graduated from the Hebrew University of Jerusalem with a BA in International Relations in 1961. He went on to earn an MA in Political Science and contemporary Jewish studies and  a PhD.

Weiss was married to Esther, with whom he had two children. Dr. Esther Weiss died of cancer in 2005.

Academic career
In 1975, Weiss he became a professor at the University of Haifa.

Political, civic and diplomatic career

Weiss served as a member of the board of the Haifa municipality between 1969 and 1981, when he was elected to the Knesset as a member of the Alignment. Between 1988 and 1992, he served as a Deputy Speaker of the Knesset, and between 1992 and 1996 as Speaker. He lost his seat in the 1999 elections.

On November 4, 1995, Weiss was on stage with Rabin and Shimon Peres at the peace rally in Tel Aviv where Rabin was assassinated. 

In 2000 he became a president of the Yad Vashem Council. From 2001 to 2003, he served as an Israeli ambassador in Poland. On 4 January 2004, for his contribution to the cooperation between Poland and Israel, President Aleksander Kwaśniewski awarded him the Grand Cross (1st class) of the Order of Merit of the Republic of Poland.

Weiss spoke Hebrew, Yiddish, Polish, Russian and English. He died on 3 February 2023 in Tel Aviv, at the age of 87.

See also
List of Knesset speakers
Israel–Poland relations

References

External links

1935 births
2023 deaths
People from Boryslav
Jews from Galicia (Eastern Europe)
Jewish concentration camp survivors
Ambassadors of Israel to Poland
Hebrew University of Jerusalem Faculty of Social Sciences alumni
Academic staff of the University of Warsaw
Grand Crosses of the Order of Merit of the Republic of Poland
Academic staff of the University of Haifa
Alignment (Israel) politicians
Israeli Labor Party politicians
Polish emigrants to Israel
Israeli people of Polish-Jewish descent
Israeli Ashkenazi Jews
Members of the 10th Knesset (1981–1984)
Members of the 11th Knesset (1984–1988)
Members of the 12th Knesset (1988–1992)
Members of the 13th Knesset (1992–1996)
Members of the 14th Knesset (1996–1999)
Speakers of the Knesset